Justin Kier (born May 30, 1998) is an American professional basketball player for the Austin Spurs of the NBA G League. He played college basketball for the Arizona Wildcats of the Pac-12 Conference. He also played for the George Mason Patriots and the Georgia Bulldogs.

High school career
Kier attended Spotswood High School. In his career, he scored 1700 points for Spotswood and earned Valley District Player of the Year honors. He committed to George Mason over scholarship offers from Coastal Carolina, UNC Greensboro, Radford and Fairfield.

College career

Kier made an immediate impact at George Mason as a freshman, averaging 5.8 points and 4.5 rebounds per game. He averaged 11.0 points, 4.6 rebounds and 2.3 assists per game as a sophomore. On December 3, 2018, he scored a career-high 32 points in a 72–67 loss to Vermont. As a junior, Kier averaged 14.5 points and 6.5 rebounds per game while shooting 47.1 percent from the field. He was named to the Second Team All-Atlantic 10 as well as the Atlantic 10 Most Improved Player. He suffered a stress fracture in the offseason that caused him to miss the first six games of his senior season. Kier missed a game with an unrelated injury in December 2019. On January 15, 2020, he reinjured his stress fracture which caused him to miss the remainder of the season. In nine games, he averaged 9.6 points and 3.6 rebounds per game.

On April 8, 2020, Kier decided to enter the transfer portal after being granted a fifth season of eligibility. He announced he was transferring to Georgia on April 26 and will be eligible immediately as a graduate transfer. Kier chose the Bulldogs over offers from Minnesota and NC State. He averaged 9.5 points, 3.7 rebounds, 2.4 assists and 1.7 steals per game while shooting 39.4 percent from the field. Kier transferred to Arizona Wildcats for his final season of eligibility. Kier led his team to the Sweet 16 in the 2022 March Madnes, where they lost to the Houston Cougars 72 - 60.

Professional career

Austin Spurs (2022–present)
On October 24, 2022, Kier joined the Austin Spurs training camp roster.

Career statistics

College

|-
| style="text-align:left;"| 2016–17
| style="text-align:left;"| George Mason
| 33 || 29 || 27.7 || .428 || .386 || .744 || 4.5 || 1.1 || .6 || .2 || 5.8
|-
| style="text-align:left;"| 2017–18
| style="text-align:left;"| George Mason
| 33 || 32 || 33.2 || .451 || .174 || .784 || 4.6 || 2.3 || 1.3 || .1 || 11.0
|-
| style="text-align:left;"| 2018–19
| style="text-align:left;"| George Mason
| 33 || 31 || 34.8 || .471 || .371 || .769 || 6.5 || 2.6 || 1.6 || .3 || 14.5
|-
| style="text-align:left;"| 2019–20
| style="text-align:left;"| George Mason
| 9 || 2 || 22.6 || .464 || .458 || .846 || 3.6 || 1.3 || .7 || .2 || 9.6
|-
| style="text-align:left;"| 2020–21
| style="text-align:left;"| Georgia
| 25 || 25 || 31.0 || .394 || .366 || .750 || 3.7 || 2.4 || 1.7 || .1 || 9.5
|-
| style="text-align:left;"| 2021–22
| style="text-align:left;"| Arizona
| 36 || 6 || 20.1 || .444 || .358 || .830 || 3.1 || 2.3 || .6 || .0 || 6.9
|- class="sortbottom"
| style="text-align:center;" colspan="2"| Career
| 169 || 125 || 28.8 || .444 || .351 || .781 || 4.4 || 2.1 || 1.1 || .2 || 9.5

Personal life
At the age of seven, Kier's mother Keley suffered a heart attack while driving a car, crashed into a tree and is now paralyzed, blind and cannot speak. Kier was in the automobile with her but was not injured, escaping through a window. As a consequence of the accident and with his father not in his life, Kier and his older brother, Rasheed, came into the custody of their grandmother, Evelyn.

See also
 List of NCAA Division I men's basketball career games played leaders

References

External links
Arizona Wildcats bio
Georgia Bulldogs bio
George Mason Patriots bio

1998 births
Living people
American men's basketball players
Arizona Wildcats men's basketball players
Austin Spurs players
Basketball players from Virginia
George Mason Patriots men's basketball players
Georgia Bulldogs basketball players
People from Grottoes, Virginia
Shooting guards